Kevin Marshall (born 25 April 1958) is a New Zealand cricketer. He played in one first-class and four List A matches for Wellington in 1983/84.

See also
 List of Wellington representative cricketers

References

External links
 

1958 births
Living people
New Zealand cricketers
Wellington cricketers
Cricketers from Wellington City